In the 2009 Holland Series DOOR Neptunus defeated the Konica Minolta Pioniers, 3 games to 1, to win the club's 12th Dutch Championship.

References